Harold "Harry" Gee (25 December 1895 – 1991) was an English professional association footballer from Haydock, Lancashire who played as a wing half.

References

1895 births
1991 deaths
People from Haydock
English footballers
Association football defenders
Burnley F.C. players
New Brighton A.F.C. players
Exeter City F.C. players
English Football League players